Keith Hamilton Cobb (born January 28, 1962) is an American actor.

Career
He is best known for his roles as the ruthless Nietzschean mercenary Tyr Anasazi in the science-fiction series Gene Roddenberry's Andromeda from 2000 to 2005 and as Noah Keefer on All My Children from 1994 to 1996.

Cobb was born in North Tarrytown, New York; he graduated from New York University's Tisch School of the Arts in 1987. A classically trained actor, he appeared in a number of Shakespearean productions in the New York area before breaking into television in the mid 1990s. One of his first movies was the 1995 film Eyes Beyond Seeing in which he plays a mental patient who claims to be Jesus Christ.

In 1996, Cobb was named on People magazine's annual list of the "50 most beautiful people".

In 1999, Cobb was in two episodes of the Beastmaster television series, portraying a character very similar to his character from Andromeda.

He left the Andromeda TV series at the start of the fourth season, citing dissatisfaction over the development of his character.

Cobb's 2015 play American Moor explores the experiences of Black actors performing texts as written and directed by white writers and directors. The play garnered great academic acclaim. The play debuted Off-Broadway at the Cherry Lane Theatre in August 2019.

He continues to act in theater productions, including roles as Oberon and Duke Theseus in A Midsummer Night's Dream in New York's Geva Theater Center, and the bigoted Juror #10 in Twelve Angry Men at Briggs Opera House in White River Junction, Vermont.

Filmography

Awards and nominations
In 1995 Cobb won the Soap Opera Digest Award - Outstanding Male Newcomer for his role of Noah Keefer on All My Children and in 1996 won the Soap Opera Digest Award - Hottest Soap Couple for his work on All My Children (shared with Sydney Penny).

References

External links
 Official Keith Hamilton Cobb website
 Keith Hamilton Cobb profile from SoapCentral
 
 Extensive interview at Republibot
 Original Short Fiction by Keith Hamilton Cobb

1962 births
Living people
People from Tarrytown, New York
American male soap opera actors
American male television actors
Tisch School of the Arts alumni
Male actors from New York (state)
20th-century American male actors
21st-century American male actors